Perdomo, is a Canary Islander noble family name originally from Normandy, France. The surname Perdomo is a Spanish version of the French surname Prudhomme, and is closely associated with the Bethencourt family of France. "Prudhomme" was a French term meaning a good or wise man used in the Middle Ages to designate local magistrates.

Origins

On May 1, 1402, Jean de Arriete left the port of La Rochelle, France with French explorer Jean de Béthencourt for the conquest of the Canary Islands. After subduing the native population, Arriete was given the title Governor Magistrate of Lanzarote by the new King of the Canary Islands, Jean IV Béthencourt. It was at this time that he hispanicized his name to Juan Arriete Perdomo.

Perdomo would eventually marry Princess Margarita Leonor de Béthencourt, daughter of King Maciot de Béthencourt (nephew and heir to the aforementioned Jean IV Béthencourt) and Princess Maria de Teguise (daughter of the last indigenous king of Lanzarote - Guadarfia).

Juan Perdomo, son of Jean Arriete Perdomo and Margarita Leonor de Béthencourt would assist in the conquest of Gran Canaria and Tenerife. Through him the family name would eventually spread to the new world.

Notable people
 Alexis Vila Perdomo, Cuban mixed martial artist
 Ángel Perdomo, Dominican baseball pitcher
 Carlos Perdomo, Belizean politician
 Chance Perdomo (born 1996), English Actor
 Eneas Perdomo (born 1930), Venezuelan singer
 Fernando Perdomo (born 1980), American musician
 Fernando Araújo Perdomo (born 1955), Colombian politician
 Geraldo Perdomo (born 1999), Dominican baseball player
 José Perdomo (born 1965), Uruguayan footballer
 Luis Perdomo (baseball, born 1984), Dominican major league baseball pitcher
 Luis Perdomo (baseball, born 1993), Dominican minor league baseball pitcher
 Luis Perdomo (pianist) (born 1971), American jazz pianist and composer
 Óscar Berger Perdomo (born 1946), Guatemalan politician
 Oscar F. Perdomo (1919-1976), American military pilot
 Richard Perdomo (born 1985), American soccer player
 Ismael Perdomo Borrero, Colombian Archbishop
 Willie Perdomo, American poet

See also 
 Prud'homme, French variant

Spanish-language surnames